Ericsson Stadium is the former name of:

Bank of America Stadium, Charlotte, North Carolina, USA.
Mount Smart Stadium, Auckland, New Zealand.